Cryptotaenia canadensis, the Canadian honewort, is a perennial plant species native to the eastern United States and eastern Canada. Its young leaves and stems can be used as a boiled green or seasoning similar to parsley. The parsniplike roots can be cooked and eaten.

References

Flora of North America
Apioideae
Plants described in 1753
Taxa named by Carl Linnaeus